Pawan Dias (born 19 October 1996) is a Sri Lankan cricketer. He made his first-class debut for Galle Cricket Club in the 2016–17 Premier League Tournament on 13 January 2017. He made his List A debut for Galle Cricket Club in the 2017–18 Premier Limited Overs Tournament on 18 March 2018. He made his Twenty20 debut for Police Sports Club in the 2018–19 SLC Twenty20 Tournament on 18 February 2019.

References

External links
 

1996 births
Living people
Sri Lankan cricketers
Galle Cricket Club cricketers
Sri Lanka Police Sports Club cricketers
Cricketers from Colombo